Yves Rees is an Australian researcher in Australian history, best known for their work on gender, transnational and economic history, as well as writings on contemporary transgender identity, and politics.

Early life and education 
Rees received their undergraduate Bachelor of Arts Honors degree in history at the University of Melbourne (2009), Master of Arts in history at University College London (2011), and completed their PhD, entitled, "Travelling to Tomorrow: Australian Women in the United States, 1910-1960" at Australian National University (2016). Their supervisor was Angela Woollacott.

Career and impact 
Rees started work at University of Sydney in 2016 as the Kathleen Fitzpatrick Junior Research Fellow and subsequently before moving to La Trobe University in 2017 as the David Myers Research Fellow. As of 2020, they are a lecturer in La Trobe University's history department. They are a board member of the History Council of Victoria and co-convenor of the Melbourne Feminist History Group.

They are also active in academic outreach, contributing to ABC radio and The Conversation, and co-hosting a history podcast.

Rees became known for their discussion of trans and topics relating to gender through an autobiographical lens.

Awards and honours 
Rees won the Calibre essay prize in 2020.

Rees won the Serle Award Winner in 2018.

Works

References

External links 
 Yves Rees's webpage

Living people
21st-century Australian historians
1988 births
Academic staff of La Trobe University